Act as 1 was a domestic violence prevention campaign  led by the Queensland Government in Australia. The campaign contained the core message that domestic violence and family violence affect women, men, children, families, neighbours, workplaces and communities and is estimated to cost the Queensland economy $2.7 to $3.2 billion annually.

Act as 1 gathered community support to bring family violence out from behind closed doors. The Act as 1 encouraged neighbours, friends, family members, colleagues and community members to take a stand against family violence and support those affected.

The campaign pointed out that we may all know someone who is experiencing family violence and suggests that we could be the "1" to spark a change and make a difference, suggesting that the more who Act as 1, the more powerful the message.

Many community groups supported the government campaign including SunnyKids which developed a television campaign raising awareness of family violence and its impact on children in particular.

The campaign also identified five ways to "Act as 1"

Support someone
Follow the campaign on Facebook and Twitter
Attend or Hold Events
Talk about it
Educate Yourself

The Act as 1 campaign also raised awareness about elder abuse during the month of May. The Domestic and Family Violence Prevention Act in Queensland recognises elder abuse as a form of Domestic and Family Violence.

References

Abuse
Domestic violence-related organizations
Violence against women in Australia
Child abuse-related organizations
Organisations based in Queensland